Downsize Me! is a New Zealand weight and diet reality series that aired on TV3. The show focuses on informing and helping overweight New Zealanders make healthy life options, lose weight and get back into shape.

Series overview

Broadcast
Downsize Me! aired on Sky Livingit in the United Kingdom, and Foxtel in Australia.

Show format
Each week a new obese person or couple appears on the show and is put under pressure to lose weight, change their diet and/or exercise habits to get their life back into shape, by a team of professional experts.

See also
Obesity in New Zealand

References

External links
Home page

2005 New Zealand television series debuts
2008 New Zealand television series endings
English-language television shows
Fitness reality television series
New Zealand reality television series
Three (TV channel) original programming